Pleurobema plenum, the rough pigtoe pearly mussel or rough pigtoe, is a species of freshwater mussel, an aquatic bivalve mollusk in the family Unionidae, the river mussels.

This species is endemic to the United States.

References

Molluscs of the United States
plenum
Bivalves described in 1840
ESA endangered species
Taxonomy articles created by Polbot